Gong Hill is a  biological Site of Special Scientific Interest south of Farnham in Surrey.

This heathland site is dominated by ling, bellheather and wavy hair-grass, with other plants including bryophytes and lichens. The south facing aspect of the site and patches of bare sand make it suitable for egg-laying reptiles, including a large population of the endangered and specially protected sand lizard.

The site is private land with no public access.

References

Sites of Special Scientific Interest in Surrey